Machia Biological Park  also known as Machia Safari Park is a zoological garden located in Jodhpur, Rajasthan, India. This biological park is situated around 7 km from the city center near Kaylana Lake.

References

Zoos in Rajasthan
2016 establishments in Rajasthan